Dysdercus is a widespread genus of true bugs in the family Pyrrhocoridae; a number of species attacking cotton bolls may be called "cotton stainers".

Description
Species may be confused with bugs in the family Lygaeidae, but can be distinguished by the lack of ocelli on the head. They can be readily distinguished from most other genera of Pyrrhocoridae by the strong white markings at the junction of the head and thorax, and along the sides of the thorax, and often abdomen.

Species 
BioLib lists the following:
 subgenus Dysdercus Guérin-Méneville, 1831
 Dysdercus andreae (Linnaeus, 1758)
 Dysdercus bimaculatus (Stål, 1854)
 Dysdercus cardinalis Gerstäcker, 1873
 Dysdercus concinnus Stål, 1861
 Dysdercus fasciatus Signoret, 1861 - cotton stainer (Africa)
 Dysdercus mimulus Hussey, 1929
 Dysdercus mimus (Say, 1832)
 Dysdercus nigrofasciatus Stål, 1855
 Dysdercus obliquus (Herrich-Schaeffer, 1843)
 Dysdercus obscuratus Distant, 1883
 Dysdercus peruvianus Guérin-Méneville, 1831 - type species
 Dysdercus suturellus (Herrich-Schäffer, 1842) - cotton stainer (USA)

 subgenus Leptophthalmus Stål, 1870
 Dysdercus decussatus Boisduval, 1835
 Dysdercus fuscomaculatus Stål, 1863

 subgenus Paradysdercus Stehlík, 1965
 Dysdercus cingulatus (Fabricius, 1775) - red cotton bug
 Dysdercus evanescens Distant, 1902
 Dysdercus koenigii (Fabricius, 1775) - red cotton stainer (Indian subcontinent)
 Dysdercus poecilus (Harrich-Schaeffer)
 Dysdercus sidae Montrouzier, 1861

 incertae sedis
 Dysdercus albofasciatus Berg, 1878
 Dysdercus argillaceus Breddin, 1895
 Dysdercus basialbus Schmidt, 1932
 Dysdercus bidentatus Hussey, 1927
 Dysdercus bloetei Doesburg, 1968
 Dysdercus chaquensis Freiberg, 1948
 Dysdercus chiriquinus Distant, 1883
 Dysdercus cinctus Scudder, 1890
 Dysdercus collaris Blöte, 1931
 Dysdercus festivus Gerstäcker, 1892
 Dysdercus flavolimbatus Stål, 1861
 Dysdercus haemorrhoidalis Signoret, 1858
 Dysdercus honestus Blöte, 1931
 Dysdercus imitator Blöte, 1931
 Dysdercus immarginatus Blöte, 1931
 Dysdercus impictiventris Stål, 1870
 Dysdercus insularis Stål, 1870
 Dysdercus intermedius Distant, 1902 - cotton stainer (Africa)
 Dysdercus longiceps Breddin, 1901
 Dysdercus longirostris Stål, 1861
 Dysdercus lunulatus Uhler, 1861
 Dysdercus maurus Distant, 1901
 Dysdercus melanoderes Karsch, 1892
 Dysdercus mesiostigma Distant
 Dysdercus mimuloides Blöte, 1933
 Dysdercus monostigma Kirby
 Dysdercus ochreatus (Say, 1832)
 Dysdercus orientalis Schouteden, 1910
 Dysdercus pretiosus Distant, 1902
 Dysdercus ruficeps (Perty, 1833)
 Dysdercus ruficollis (Linnaeus, 1764)
 Dysdercus rusticus Stål, 1870
 Dysdercus sanguinarius Stål, 1870
 Dysdercus scassellati Del Guercio, 1918
 Dysdercus stehliki Schaefer, 2013
 Dysdercus superstitiosus (Fabricius, 1775)
 Dysdercus unicolor Scudder, 1890
 Dysdercus wilhelminae van Doesburg, 1968

References

External links
 North American Dysdercus species
 

Pyrrhocoridae
Pentatomomorpha genera